St. Mary's Elementary School and St. Mary's Jr./Sr. High School, known as St. Mary's Schools, are private, Roman Catholic Schools in Worcester, Massachusetts serving Pre-K through Grade 12. It is located in the Vernon Hill section of Worcester, Massachusetts in the Roman Catholic Diocese of Worcester.

History
The
construction of St. Mary's Elementary began in 1914.  The school first opened its doors in 1915 to provide
primary school education for the children of Our Lady of Czestochowa
Parish.  In 1936, St. Mary's School
expanded to include high school and graduated its first senior class in
1940.  St. Mary's Schools were originally staffed exclusively by nuns from the Sisters of the Holy Family of Nazareth but at present the faculty is entirely lay. They celebrated 100 years of
Catholic education tin 2015

Now,
one hundred years after its founding, St. Mary's Schools not only serve the
youth of Our Lady of Czestochowa Parish but students from Worcester and
surrounding towns and students from all religious and cultural backgrounds.  St. Mary's Schools continues to promote
academic excellence while fostering spiritual growth in the Catholic tradition.

Notes and references

External links
 St. Mary's Website

Catholic secondary schools in Massachusetts
High schools in Worcester, Massachusetts
Educational institutions established in 1915
Private middle schools in Massachusetts
1915 establishments in Massachusetts